The BDP Album is the eleventh solo studio album by American rapper and record producer KRS-One. It was released on January 10, 2012 through 6.8.2 Records, dedicated to reviving the crew name of Boogie Down Productions. Production was handled by DJ Kenny Parker and KRS-One. It features guest appearances from Channel Live, Inyang Bassey and Jesse West.

Track listing

Personnel
Lawrence Parker – main artist, mixing & producer (track 13), executive producer
Channel Live – featured artist (track 3)
Jesse Williams – featured artist (track 12)
Inyang Bassey – featured artist (track 14)
Kenny Parker – mixing & producer (tracks: 1-12, 14)
Derek Showard – mastering
Mr. Mass – cover photography
Adam "Illus" Wallenta – artwork, design
Dietrich Schoenemann – lacquer cut

References

External links

2012 albums
KRS-One albums
Albums produced by KRS-One